Freycinet Commonwealth Marine Reserve is a 57,942 km2 marine protected area within Australian waters located off the east coast of Tasmania. It extends to the outer limits of the Australian exclusive economic zone in the Tasman Sea. The reserve was established in 2007 and is part of the South-east Commonwealth Marine Reserve Network. It is the largest reserve of the South-east Network, the area covered is approximately equivalent to about 86% of the land area of Tasmania.

Several large offshore seamounts believed to be too deep to have been fished are within the reserved area. Seamounts generally host a wide variety of habitats that support deep ocean biodiversity, the large seamounts to the east of Tasmania are individually important, as they are expected to include endemic species. The shallower regions of the reserve includes habitat important to seabirds. Great white shark also forage in the reserve.

Protection
Most of the Freycinet marine reserve area is IUCN protected area category II. A small portion near the coast is zoned as 'Recreational Use' (IUCN IV) and 'Multiple Use' (IUCN VI).

See also

Commonwealth marine reserves
Protected areas of Australia
Pacific Ocean

Notes

References

External links
Freycinet Commonwealth Marine Reserve Network website

South-east Commonwealth Marine Reserves Network
Protected areas established in 2007